Can I Say is the debut album by the American melodic hardcore band Dag Nasty, originally released in 1986 on Dischord Records. It was remastered and re-released on CD with bonus songs in 2002. "Circles" appeared on a best-of emo songs list by Vulture.

Track listing
All tracks by Dag Nasty.
Side one
"Values Here" – 2:23
"One to Two" – 2:15
"Circles" – 2:46
"Thin Line" – 2:30
"Justification" – 2:51

Side two
"What Now?" – 2:16
"I've Heard" – 1:43
"Under Your Influence" – 2:36
"Can I Say" – 1:59
"Never Go Back" – 2:52

2002 CD reissue bonus tracks
"Another Wrong" – 2:18
"My Dog's a Cat" – 2:19
"I've Heard (Live)" – 2:18
"Another Wrong (Live)" – 2:22
"Trying (Live)" – 2:09
"Justification (Live)" – 3:58

Personnel
Dag Nasty
Dave Smalley - vocals
Brian Baker - guitars
Roger Marbury - bass guitar
Colin Sears - drums
Ian MacKaye - producer
Dag Nasty - producer

References

Dag Nasty albums
1986 debut albums